Tahkuranna is a village in Häädemeeste Parish, Pärnu County in southwestern Estonia. It is the birthplace of Konstantin Päts, the first president of Estonia and his brother, artist and politician Voldemar Päts. Tiit Helmja, an Olympic rower, was also born in Tahkuranna.

References

Villages in Pärnu County
Kreis Pernau